The Static vs. The Strings Vol. 1 is the third full-length album by Centro-matic.

Track listing 

 Calling Up The Bastards 
 Who’s Telling You Now? 
 The Execution Of Some Sixty-Odd Drummers 
 Neighbors. Habits. Downtown. 
 Recaptured the Silent Way 
 Repellant Feed 
 Turning Your Decisions 
 Wrecking This Show 
 D. Boon-Free (a Ninth Grade Crime) 
 Say Something / 95 Frowns 
 Curb Your Turbulence 
 Now That You Have Blown Away The Cards 
 You Might Need This Now 
 Keep the Phoenix in Slow Motion

Personnel 
 Will Johnson - vocals, guitars
 Scott Danbom - vocals, keyboards, violin
 Mark Hedman - bass
 Matt Pence - drums

References

External links
Official site

Centro-Matic albums
1999 albums